The 2023 NCAA Division I baseball season, play of college baseball in the United States organized by the National Collegiate Athletic Association (NCAA) at the Division I level, began on February 17, 2023.  The ongoing regular season will be followed by many conference tournaments and championship series, and the season concludes with the 2023 NCAA Division I baseball tournament and 2023 Men's College World Series. The Men's College World Series, consisting of the eight remaining teams in the NCAA tournament and held annually in Omaha, Nebraska, at Charles Schwab Field Omaha, will end in June 2023.

Realignment

A total of 22 baseball-sponsoring schools changed conferences after the 2022 season.
 The 2022 season proved to be the last for baseball in the Mid-Eastern Athletic Conference (MEAC) for the immediate future. On July 12, 2022, the Northeast Conference (NEC) and MEAC announced a partnership in which all MEAC members that sponsored baseball and men's and women's golf became NEC affiliates in those sports effective immediately. Accordingly, Coppin State, Delaware State, Maryland Eastern Shore, and Norfolk State became NEC baseball affiliates for the 2023 season and beyond.
 Austin Peay, Belmont, and Murray State left the Ohio Valley Conference. Peay joined the ASUN Conference, and Belmont and Murray State joined the Missouri Valley Conference (MVC).
 Bryant and Mount St. Mary's left the NEC, respectively for the America East Conference and Metro Atlantic Athletic Conference (MAAC).
 Dallas Baptist, a baseball-only member of the MVC, left for Conference USA (C-USA).
 Hartford, which began a transition to NCAA Division III in the 2021–22 school year, left the America East to become an independent for 2022–23 before joining the D-III Commonwealth Coast Conference in 2023.
 James Madison left the Colonial Athletic Association (CAA) for the Sun Belt Conference (SBC).
 Lamar, which had announced it would leave the WAC to return to its former home of the Southland Conference (SLC) in 2023–24, expedited this move to 2022–23.
 Little Rock and UT Arlington left the SBC, respectively for the OVC and WAC.
 Marshall, Old Dominion, and Southern Miss left C-USA for the SBC.
 Monmouth left the MAAC for the CAA.
 North Carolina A&T left the Big South Conference after only one season for the CAA.
 Stony Brook left the America East for the CAA.
 UIC left the Horizon League for the MVC.

Incarnate Word had announced plans to leave the SLC for the WAC after the 2022 season, but days before that move was to take effect, the school announced it was staying in the SLC.

The 2023 season will be the last for 14 baseball schools in their current conferences, as well as the aforementioned Hartford's only season as a D-I independent.
 BYU, Cincinnati, Houston, and UCF will move to the Big 12 Conference. BYU is leaving the West Coast Conference, while the others are leaving the American Athletic Conference.
 Campbell will leave the Big South Conference for the CAA.
 Charlotte, Florida Atlantic, Rice, UAB, and UTSA will leave C-USA for The American.
 Jacksonville State, Liberty, New Mexico State, and Sam Houston will all join C-USA. Jacksonville State and Liberty are leaving the ASUN, and New Mexico State and Sam Houston the WAC.

Other changes from 2022
Two Division I members adopted new names after the 2022 season. Neither school's nickname was affected.
 Dixie State University changed its forward-facing name to Utah Tech University in May 2022, ahead of the legal name change on July 1. The nickname remains Trailblazers.
 Houston Baptist University became Houston Christian University on September 21, 2022. The nickname remains Huskies.

Season outlook

Conference standings

Conference winners and tournaments
Thirty athletic conferences each end their regular seasons with a single-elimination tournament or a double-elimination tournament. The teams in each conference that win their regular season title are given the number one seed in each tournament. The winners of these tournaments receive automatic invitations to the 2023 NCAA Division I baseball tournament.

Men's College World Series

Coaching changes
This table lists programs that changed head coaches at any point from the first day of the 2023 season until the day before the first day of the 2024 season.

See also
2023 NCAA Division I softball season

References